Robert Fripp (born 16 May 1946) is a British musician, songwriter, record producer, and author, best known as the guitarist, founder and longest-lasting member of the progressive rock band King Crimson. He has worked extensively as a session musician and collaborator, notably with David Bowie, Blondie, Brian Eno, Peter Gabriel, Daryl Hall, Midge Ure, Talking Heads, and David Sylvian. He also composed the startup sound of Windows Vista operating system, in collaboration with Tucker Martine and Steve Ball. His discography includes contributions to over 700 official releases.

His compositions often feature unusual asymmetric rhythms, influenced by classical and folk traditions. His innovations include a tape delay system known as Frippertronics and new standard tuning.

Early life
Robert Fripp was born in Wimborne Minster, Dorset, England, the second child of a working-class family. His mother Edith (née Greene; 1914–1993) was from a Welsh mining family. Her earnings from working at the Bournemouth Records Office allowed his father, Arthur Henry Fripp (1910-1985) to start a business as an estate agent. In 1957, at age eleven, Fripp received a guitar for Christmas from his parents and recalled, "Almost immediately I knew that this guitar was going to be my life". He then took guitar lessons from Kathleen Gartell and Don Strike; at age 11, Elvis Presley's guitarist Scotty Moore inspired Fripp to play rock, moving on to traditional jazz at 13 and modern jazz at 15. He cited jazz musicians Charlie Parker and Charles Mingus as his musical influences during this time.

In 1961, the fifteen-year-old Fripp joined his first band, The Ravens, which also included Gordon Haskell on bass. After they split in the following year, Fripp concentrated on his O-level studies and joined his father's firm as a junior negotiator. At this point, he intended to study estate management and eventually, take over his father's business. However, at seventeen, Fripp decided to become a professional musician. He became the guitarist in the jazz outfit The Douglas Ward Trio, playing in the Chewton Glen Hotel of New Milton, followed by a stint in the rock and roll band The League of Gentlemen which included two former Ravens members.

In 1965, Fripp left the group to attend Bournemouth College, where he studied economics, economic history, and political history for his A-levels. In February 1965, Fripp went to see the Duke Ellington Orchestra, an experience which moved him deeply. He subsequently spent three further years playing light jazz in the Majestic Dance Orchestra at Bournemouth's Majestic Hotel (replacing future The Police guitarist Andy Summers, who had gone off to London with Zoot Money). It was during this time when he met musicians that he would collaborate with in his career: John Wetton, Richard Palmer-James, and Greg Lake. At age 21, going back home from college late at night, Fripp tuned on to Radio Luxemburg where he heard the last moments of "A Day in the Life". "Galvanized" by the experience, he went on to listen to Sgt. Pepper's Lonely Hearts Club Band, Béla Bartók's string quartets, Antonín Dvořák's New World Symphony, Jimi Hendrix's Are You Experienced and John Mayall & the Bluesbreakers. Many years later, Fripp would recall that "although all the dialects are different, the voice was the same... I knew I couldn't say no".

Career

1967–1974: Giles, Giles and Fripp and King Crimson
In 1967, Fripp responded to an advertisement placed by Bournemouth-born brothers Peter and Michael Giles, who wanted to work with a singing organist. Though Fripp was not what they sought, his audition with them was a success and the trio relocated to London and became Giles, Giles and Fripp. Their only studio album, The Cheerful Insanity of Giles, Giles and Fripp, was released in 1968. Despite the recruitment of two further members – singer Judy Dyble (formerly with Fairport Convention and later of Trader Horne) and multi-instrumentalist Ian McDonald – Fripp felt that he was outgrowing the eccentric pop approach favoured by Peter Giles (preferring the more ambitious compositions being written by McDonald) and the band broke up in 1968.

Almost immediately, Fripp, McDonald and Michael Giles formed the first lineup of King Crimson in mid-1968, recruiting Fripp's old Bournemouth College friend Greg Lake as lead singer and bass player, and McDonald's writing partner Peter Sinfield as lyricist, light show designer and general creative consultant. King Crimson's debut album, In the Court of the Crimson King, was released in late 1969 to great success: drawing on rock, jazz and European folk/classical music ideas, it is regarded as one of the most influential albums in the history of progressive rock. The band was tipped for stardom but (due to growing musical differences between Fripp on one side and Giles and McDonald on the other) broke up at the end of its first American tour in 1969. A despondent Fripp offered to leave the group if it would allow King Crimson to survive; however, Giles and McDonald had independently decided that the band's music was "more Fripp's than theirs" and that it would be better if they were the ones to leave.

During the recording of the band's second album In the Wake of Poseidon, Greg Lake departed to form Emerson, Lake and Palmer, leaving Fripp and Sinfield as the only remaining founder members. They issued two more albums (Lizard and Islands) and were the only constants in a regularly changing King Crimson lineup. It included (at various times) Gordon Haskell, saxophonist/flute player Mel Collins, drummers Andy McCulloch and Ian Wallace and future Bad Company bass player Boz Burrell, in addition to a palette of guest players from Soft Machine, Keith Tippett's band, Brotherhood of Breath and Centipede. Fripp was listed as the sole composer of the band's music during this time, which built on the first album's blueprint but progressed further into jazz rock and free jazz while also taking form from Sinfield's esoteric lyrical and mythological concepts.

In 1971, Fripp ousted Sinfield and took over de facto leadership of King Crimson (although he has always formally rejected the label, preferring to describe his role as "quality control" or "a kind of glue"). From this point onwards, Fripp would be the only constant member of the band, which in turn would be defined primarily by his compositional and conceptual ideas (which drew on avant-garde jazz and improvisation mixed with a variety of hard rock and European influences, in particular the music of Béla Bartók). With avant-garde percussionist Jamie Muir, violinist David Cross, singing bass player John Wetton and former Yes drummer Bill Bruford now in the ranks, King Crimson produced three more albums of innovative and increasingly experimental rock, shedding members as they progressed: beginning with Larks' Tongues in Aspic, progressing with Starless and Bible Black and culminating in the benchmark avant-power trio album Red. Fripp formally disbanded the group in 1974, in what eventually turned out to be merely the first in a regular series of long hiatuses and further transformations.

1974–1981: Collaborations, side projects, and solo career
Fripp pursued side projects during King Crimson's less active periods. He worked with Keith Tippett (and others who appeared on King Crimson records) on projects far from rock music, playing with and producing Centipede's Septober Energy in 1971 and Ovary Lodge in 1973. During this period he also worked with Van der Graaf Generator, playing on the 1970 album H to He, Who Am the Only One, and in 1971, on Pawn Hearts. He produced Matching Mole's Matching Mole's Little Red Record in 1972. Prior to forming the Larks-era KC, he collaborated on a spoken-word album with a woman he described as "a witch", but the resulting Robert Fripp & Walli Elmlark: The Cosmic Children of Rock was never officially released.

With Brian Eno, Fripp recorded (No Pussyfooting) in 1972, and Evening Star in 1974. These experimented with several avant-garde musical techniques that were new to rock. On "The Heavenly Music Corporation" from No Pussyfooting, Fripp used a tape delay system using two modified Revox A77 reel-to-reel tape machines for the first time.  The technique went on to play a central role in Fripp's later work, and became known as "Frippertronics".

In 1973, Fripp performed the guitar solo on "Baby's on Fire", perhaps the best-known track on Eno's solo debut Here Come the Warm Jets. In 1975, Fripp and Brian Eno played live shows in Europe, and Fripp also contributed guitar solos to Eno's landmark album Another Green World.

Fripp started what was intended as a permanent sabbatical from his career in 1975, during which he cultivated an interest in the teachings of Gurdjieff via J. G. Bennett (studies which would later be influential in his work with Guitar Craft). He returned to musical work as a studio guitarist on Peter Gabriel's first self-titled album in 1976, released the following year. Fripp toured with Gabriel to support the album, but remained out of sight (either in the wings or behind a curtain) and used the pseudonym "Dusty Rhodes".

He produced and played on Gabriel's second album in 1978. "Robert is particularly skilful at keeping things fresh, and I like that a lot," Gabriel enthused. "I was very interested in Robert's experimental side; that corresponded exactly to what I wanted to do on this second record… There are two (Fripp) solos: one on 'On the Air' and the other on 'White Shadow'. And then he plays on 'Exposure'. He gives the colour to this piece, being fifty per cent responsible for its construction. And he also plays classical guitar here and there. He's a musician I admire a lot, because he's one of the only ones to mix discipline and madness with so much talent."

In 1977, Fripp received a phone call from Eno, who was working on David Bowie's album "Heroes". Fripp and Eno had collaborated on an album released in 1975 called Evening Star. On this album – particularly 'An Index of Metals' – are strains that would influence the Bowie project two years later, notably its second side. Fripp's playing on Heroes initiated a series of collaborations with other musicians. Fripp soon collaborated with Daryl Hall on Sacred Songs.

During this period, Fripp began working on solo material, with contributions from poet/lyricist Joanna Walton and several other musicians, including Eno, Gabriel, and Hall (including the latter's partner, John Oates), as well as Peter Hammill, Jerry Marotta, Phil Collins, Tony Levin and Terre Roche. This material eventually became his first solo album, Exposure, released in 1979, followed by the Frippertronics tour in the same year.

While living in New York, Fripp contributed to albums and live performances by Blondie (Parallel Lines) and Talking Heads (Fear of Music), and produced The Roches' first and third albums, which featured several of Fripp's characteristic guitar solos. A second set of creative sessions with David Bowie produced distinctive guitar parts on Scary Monsters (and Super Creeps) (1980) and prior to that, Peter Gabriel's third solo album known as Melt. With Blondie, Fripp appeared live on stage at Hammersmith Odeon on 12 January 1980 participating in the band's cover version of Bowie's Heroes. This recording was on the 12" single of Atomic released the same year and later turned up as a bonus track on CD pressings of Blondie's album Eat to the Beat.

Fripp's collaboration with bassist Busta Jones, drummer Paul Duskin, and vocals by David Byrne (Byrne credited as Absalm el Habib) produced God Save the Queen/Under Heavy Manners in the following year. He simultaneously assembled what he called a "second-division touring new wave instrumental dance band" under the name League of Gentlemen, with bassist Sara Lee, keyboardist Barry Andrews and drummer Johnny Elichaoff (credited as "Johnny Toobad").  Elichaoff was later replaced by Kevin Wilkinson. The LOG toured for the duration of 1980.

In 1985 he produced the album Journey to Inaccessible Places by classical pianist Elan Sicroff, released on the Editions E.G. label.

1981–1984: Reforming King Crimson

1981 saw the formation of a new King Crimson lineup, reuniting Fripp with drummer Bill Bruford and opening a new partnership with two American musicians: bass guitarist/Chapman Stick player Tony Levin (who had played with Fripp on Exposure and in the first Peter Gabriel touring band) and Adrian Belew, a singer and guitarist who had previously played with Bowie, Talking Heads and Frank Zappa. Although the band had been conceptualised under the name Discipline it came to Fripp's attention that the other members thought the name King Crimson was more appropriate: for Fripp, King Crimson had always been "a way of doing things" rather than a particular group of musicians, and the current group felt that their music captured that methodology. With the more pop-inspired Belew as main songwriter (complementing Fripp as main instrumental composer) the band took on a new style incorporating a gamelan-inspired continuo minimalism, New York influences from post-punk to go-go, and textured experiments with guitar synthesizers. After releasing three albums (Discipline, Beat, Three of a Perfect Pair), this new King Crimson broke up in 1984.

During this period Fripp made two records with his old friend Andy Summers of The Police. On I Advance Masked, Fripp and Summers played all the instruments. Bewitched was dominated more by Summers, who produced the record and collaborated with other musicians in addition to Fripp.

In 1982 Fripp produced and played guitar on Keep on Doing by The Roches. As in his previous guesting on David Bowie's Scary Monsters (and Super Creeps) (which also featured Pete Townshend and Chuck Hammer on guitar synthesizer), Fripp's distinctive guitar style and sound that characterised his music of this period is featured alongside the sisters' songs and harmony.

Guitar Craft

Fripp was offered a teaching position at the American Society for Continuous Education (ASCE) in Claymont Court, West Virginia in 1984. He had been involved with the ASCE since 1978, eventually serving on its board of directors, and had long been considering the idea of teaching guitar. His course, Guitar Craft, was begun in 1985, an offshoot of which was a performance group, "The League of Crafty Guitarists", which has released several albums. In 1986, he released the first of two collaborations with his wife, Toyah Willcox. The members of the California Guitar Trio are former members of The League of Crafty Guitarists and have also toured with King Crimson. Fripp is the patron of the Guitar Circle of Europe, which was founded in 2007, and of the Seattle Circle Guitar School, which was founded in 2010.

In February 2009, Fripp recommended that Guitar Craft cease to exist on its 25th anniversary in 2010.

On 1 September 2022 Fripp published The Guitar Circle, a book of writings concerning Guitar Craft.

Soundscapes

Fripp returned to recording solo in 1994, using an updated version of the Frippertronics technique that creates loops employing digital technology instead of analogue tapes. Fripp has released a number of records that he called "soundscapes", including 1999, Radiophonics, A Blessing of Tears, That Which Passes, November Suite, The Gates of Paradise, Love Cannot Bear and At the End of Time, as well as numerous download-only live recordings. (The sampler Pie Jesu consists of material compiled from A Blessing of Tears and The Gates of Paradise.)

1990s collaborations with David Sylvian and others

Fripp's collaborations with David Sylvian feature some of his most exuberant guitar playing. Fripp contributed to Sylvian's twenty-minute track "Steel Cathedrals" from his Alchemy: An Index of Possibilities album of 1985. Then Fripp performed on several tracks from Sylvian's 1986 release, Gone to Earth.

In late 1991, Fripp had asked Sylvian to join a re-forming King Crimson as a vocalist. Sylvian declined the invitation, but proposed a possible collaboration between the two that would eventually become a tour of Japan and Italy in the spring of 1992.

Also in 1991, Fripp released an album with the project Sunday All Over The World, also featuring his wife Toyah Willcox, former League of Crafty Guitarists member Trey Gunn on Chapman Stick, and drummer Paul Beavis. The prior name of this band was Fripp Fripp, and they toured as such in 1988. They renamed to SAOTW, and toured again as SAOTW, in 1989.

In July 1993, Sylvian and Fripp released the collaborative effort The First Day. Other contributors were soon-to-be King Crimson member Trey Gunn on Chapman Stick and Jerry Marotta (who, like Sylvian, almost became a member of King Crimson) on drums. When the group toured to promote the CD, future King Crimson member Pat Mastelotto took over the drumming spot. The live document Damage was released in 1994, as was the joint venture, Redemption – Approaching Silence, which featured Sylvian's ambient sound sculptures (Approaching Silence) accompanying Fripp reading his own text (Redemption).

During the early and mid-1990s Fripp contributed guitar/soundscapes to Lifeforms (1994) by the Future Sound of London and Cydonia (released 2001) by the Orb, as well as FFWD, a collaborative effort with the latter's members. In addition, Fripp worked with Brian Eno co-writing and supplying guitar to two tracks for a CD-ROM project released in 1994 entitled Headcandy created by Chris Juul and Doug Jipson. Eno thought the visual aspects of the disc (video feedback effects) were very disappointing upon completion, and regretted participation. During this period, Fripp also contributed to albums by No-Man and the Beloved (1994's Flowermouth and 1996's X, respectively). He also contributed soundscapes and guitar to two albums by the UK band Iona: 1993's Beyond These Shores and 1996's Journey into the Morn.

King Crimson redux (1994–2010)

In late 1994, Fripp re-formed the 1981 line-up of King Crimson for its fifth incarnation, adding Trey Gunn and drummer Pat Mastelotto in a configuration known as the "double trio" (the line-up included two guitars, two bass/Stick players and two drummers). This line-up released the VROOOM EP in 1994, and the Thrak album in 1995.

Though musically (and relatively commercially) successful, the double-trio King Crimson proved difficult to sustain in the long-term. From 1997 to 1999, the band "fraKctalised" into five experimental instrumental sub-groups known as ProjeKcts. By 1998 Bruford had quit the band altogether: in 2000, Fripp, Belew, Gunn and Mastelotto reunited as a four-piece King Crimson (minus Levin, who was busy with session work). This lineup produced two studio albums, the construKction of light in 2000 and The Power to Believe in 2003, which took on a more metallic, heavily electronic approach. Gunn departed at the end of 2003.

Although Levin immediately returned to the band, another hiatus followed until King Crimson reappeared in 2007 with a second drummer - Gavin Harrison of Porcupine Tree - appended to the lineup, This version of the band played a brief eastern USA tour in 2008, reassessing its 1981-2003 back catalogue and approach and introducing lengthy percussion duets between the two drummers. No new original material was recorded, and in 2010, Fripp announced that King Crimson were on another indefinite hiatus.

Recent work: G3, Porcupine Tree, Slow Music, Theo Travis, the Humans, Jakko Jakszyk, Others
In 2004, Fripp toured with Joe Satriani and Steve Vai as the guitar trio G3. He also worked at Microsoft's studios to record the startup sound for Windows Vista. Fripp designed the soundscape and composed the melody, while Tucker Martine created the rhythm and Microsoft's own Steve Ball added the harmonies and created the final arrangement.

In late 2005 and early 2006, Fripp joined sometime R.E.M./Nine Inch Nails drummer Bill Rieflin's improvisational Slow Music project, along with guitarist Peter Buck, Fred Chalenor (acoustic bass), Matt Chamberlain (drums) and Hector Zazou (electronics). This collective of musicians toured the west coast of America in May 2006.

In 2006 Fripp contributed his composition "At The End Of Time" to the Artists for Charity album Guitarists 4 the Kids, produced by Slang Productions, to assist World Vision Canada in helping underprivileged children. Throughout 2006, Fripp would perform many solo concerts of soundscapes in intimate settings in churches around England and Estonia. In October 2006, ProjeKct Six (Robert Fripp, Adrian Belew) played at select venues on the east coast of the U.S., opening for Porcupine Tree. In the same year, Fripp contributed soundscapes to two songs for Porcupine Tree's Fear of a Blank Planet - "Way Out of Here" and "Nil Recurring," the second of which was released in September 2007 as part of the Nil Recurring EP. Fripp also sporadically performed Soundscapes as an opening act for Porcupine Tree on various tours from 2006 through 2009.

In 2008, Fripp collaborated with Theo Travis on an album of guitar and flute-or-saxophone duets called 'Thread', and the duo played a brief English tour in 2009 (repeating the collaboration with the Follow album in 2012). Also in 2009, Fripp played a concert with the band the Humans (which consists of his wife Toyah Willcox, Bill Rieflin and Chris Wong), appeared on Judy Dyble's Talking With Strangers (along with Pat Mastelotto and others) and played on two tracks on Jakko Jakszyk's album The Bruised Romantic Glee Club. In 2010, Fripp contributed a guitar solo to an extended version of the song 'Heathen Child' by Grinderman, released as a B-side on the 'Super Heathen Child' single.

In 2021, the ambient/electronica album Leviathan was released. Fripp produced it and played guitar, in collaboration with British  EDM Duo The Grid.

A Scarcity of Miracles, musical 'retirement' and new lineup of King Crimson

In May 2011, Jakko Jakszyk, Robert Fripp and Mel Collins released a song album called A Scarcity of Miracles: A King Crimson ProjeKct on the Panegyric label. The album also featured contributions by Tony Levin and Gavin Harrison, leading to speculation that the project was a dry run for a new King Crimson.

In an interview published 3 August 2012, Fripp stated that he had retired from working as a professional musician, citing long-standing differences with Universal Music Group and stating that working within the music industry had become "a joyless exercise in futility". This retirement proved to be short-lived, lasting as long as it took to come to a settlement with UMG.

In his online diary entry for 6 September 2013, Fripp announced the return of King Crimson as a seven-piece unit with "four Englishmen and three Americans". The new lineup was Fripp, Levin, both Mastelotto and Harrison on drums, returning 1970s band member Mel Collins and two new members: Jakko Jakszyk as singer and second guitarist, and Bill Rieflin as a third drummer. This version of the band went on tour in 2014 and 2015 with a setlist reworking and reconfiguring the band's 1960s and 1970s material (plus songs from A Scarcity of Miracles and new compositions). In early 2016, it was announced that former Lemon Trees/Noel Gallagher drummer Jeremy Stacey would substitute for Rieflin on that year's tour while the latter was on sabbatical. King Crimson has since continued touring as a seven- or eight-piece unit with Stacey as a permanent member on drums and keyboards, plus Rieflin (when available) on keyboards and "fairy dusting." Rieflin last played with Crimson on the 2018 tours; he died 24 March 2020.

Equipment
During the early years of King Crimson (1968–74), Fripp used two Gibson Les Paul guitars from 1957 and 1959. The '57 guitar featured three humbucker pick-ups (with one volume control on the pickguard controlling the middle pick-up). In the band's 1980s era, he favoured Roland GR-303 & GR-808 guitars for both straight guitar and synth control. In subsequent years, Fripp has used customized Les Paul-style guitars by Tokai, 48th St Custom, and Fernandes (the latter being his current choice).

A signature model named for the guitarist (Crimson Guitars Robert Fripp Signature) features Fernandes Sustainer and MIDI pickups with a Les Paul-style body. A significant difference from the Gibson Les Paul is that the signature model is built using a deep set neck tenon rather than a traditional set neck.

Fripp recommended that Guitar Craft students adopt the Ovation 1867 Legend steel-string guitar, which had a shallow body. "Fripp liked the way the Ovation 1867 fitted against his body, which made it possible for him to assume the right-arm picking position he had developed using electric guitars over the years; on deeper-bodied guitars, the Frippian arm position is impossible without uncomfortable contortions", according to Tamm. While the 1867 Legend is no longer manufactured, it influenced the design of the Guitar Craft Pro Model of Guitar Craft Guitars, which  has been endorsed by Fripp.

Guitar technique

Fripp began playing guitar at the age of eleven. When he started, he was tone deaf and had no rhythmic sense, weaknesses which led him later to comment "Music so wishes to be heard that it sometimes calls on unlikely characters to give it voice." He was also naturally left-handed but opted to play the guitar right-handed.

While being taught guitar basics by his teacher Don Strike, Fripp began to develop the technique of crosspicking, which became one of his specialities. Fripp teaches crosspicking to his students in Guitar Craft.

In 1985, Fripp began using a tuning he called "New Standard tuning" (C2-G2-D3-A3-E4-G4), which would also become popularised in Guitar Craft.

Fripp's guitar technique, unlike most rock guitarists of his era, is not blues-based but rather influenced by avant-garde jazz and European classical music. He combines rapid alternate picking and crosspicking with motifs employing whole-tone or diminished pitch structures and sixteenth-note patterns for long stretches in a form called moto perpetuo (perpetual motion).

Rather than stand when performing, he seats himself on a stool (unusual for a performer in rock music), and by doing so was called in a May 1974 issue of Guitar Player "the guitarist who sits on stage".

Comments from other artists 

Many artists have cited Fripp as an influence or have expressed their admiration for him, including Steven Wilson, Omar Rodríguez-López, Trey Anastasio of Phish, St. Vincent, Kirk Hammett of Metallica, Michael Angelo Batio, Geoff Tate of Queensrÿche, Nels Cline of Wilco, Adam Jones of Tool, Merzbow, Vernon Reid of Living Colour, Ben Weinman of The Dillinger Escape Plan, Paul Masvidal of Cynic, Steve Stevens of Billy Idol, Chris Haskett of Rollins Band, Ivar Bjørnson of Enslaved, Dylan Carlson of Earth, Dan Briggs, Denis "Piggy" D'Amour of Voivod, Daniel Mongrain, Marcus Henderson, Paul Lemos of Controlled Bleeding, Richard Pinhas, Nick Reinhart of Tera Melos, Leopold Ross, electronic musician Rustie, film director Hal Hartley, and Sean Beavan.

Personal life 
Fripp married singer and actress Toyah Willcox on 16 May 1986 in Poole, Dorset, England. From December 1987 until July 1999 they lived at and renovated Reddish House, the former home of Cecil Beaton, in the village of Broad Chalke in Wiltshire.

Fripp previously lived at Thornhill Cottage, Holt, Dorset (1971-1980) and Fernhill House, Witchampton (1980-1987). After Reddish House, the couple lived at Evershot Old Mansion (1999-2001). They then moved to their present home in Pershore, Worcestershire. The couple have no children and have arranged their will so as to leave their entire fortune to the establishment of a musical educational trust for children.

Fripp is the patron of the Seattle Circle Guitar School in the United States and the Shallal Dance Theatre in Penzance, England. He also has had engagements as a motivational speaker, often at events with his sister Patricia, who is a keynote speaker and speech coach.

Alfie Fripp, the last of the "39ers", shot down by the Luftwaffe and then held in 12 different POW camps during World War II, was his uncle.

Fripp is a pescetarian.

During the COVID-19 lockdowns, Fripp and Willcox uploaded many short, humorous videos to YouTube, usually covers of well-known songs, and mostly titled Toyah and Robert's Sunday Lunch. According to rock and metal news website MetalSucks, their stories about these covers were extremely popular; their cover of Metallica’s “Enter Sandman” was the site’s 6th-most popular story that year.

Awards and honours 
Asteroid 81947 Fripp, discovered by Marc Buie at Cerro Tololo in 2000, was named in his honour. The official  was published by the Minor Planet Center on 18 May 2019.

Fripp is ranked 62nd on Rolling Stone magazine's 2011 list of the 100 Greatest Guitarists of All Time after having been ranked 42nd by David Fricke on its 2003 list. Tied with Andrés Segovia, he is ranked 47th on Gibson's Top 50 guitarists of all time.

Discipline Global Mobile

In 1992, Fripp and producer/online content developer David Singleton co-founded Discipline Global Mobile (DGM) as an independent music label. DGM releases music by Fripp, KC, related acts, and other artists in CDs and in downloadable files. A 1998 Billboard profile stated that DGM had ten staff-members in Salisbury (England) and Los Angeles (USA). DGM has an aim "to be a model of ethical business in an industry founded on exploitation, oiled by deceit, riven with theft and fueled by greed." DGM insists that its artists retain all copyrights; consequently, even DGM's "knotwork" corporate-logo (pictured above) is owned by its designer, Steve Ball; the "knotwork" logo appeared earlier on the cover of later versions of the Discipline album. DGM's aims were called "exemplary" by Bill , who wrote that "Fripp has done something very important for the possibilities of experimental music" in creating DGM, which "has played a major role in creating favorable conditions for" King Crimson.

DGM publishes an on-line diary by Fripp, who often comments on performances and on relations with fans. A moderated forum allows fans to ask questions or to leave comments. Together, Fripp's diary and the fan forum display delayed dialogs in which Fripp and fans discuss diary-entries and forum-postings.

Copyright infringement complaints
In 2009, Fripp released a statement claiming that EMI & Sanctuary Universal had uploaded music to various music stores without his consent, stating "NONE of these downloads were licensed, authorised or legitimised. that is, every single download of any KC track represents copyright violation. or, to use one syllable instead of seven, theft."

In 2011, Fripp complained that the music-distribution service Grooveshark continued to stream his music despite his having delivered repeated takedown notices. Fripp and Grooveshark's correspondence was published by Digital Music News and in his diaries, which appear on the website of Discipline Global Mobile.

Fripp's published exchange was included in a suit against Grooveshark by Universal Music Group, which was filed in November 2011. UMG cited internal documents revealing that Grooveshark employees uploaded thousands of illegal copies of UMG-owned recordings. Fripp had previous experience protecting his music in litigation with music companies.
Fripp has stated he believes "Unauthorised streaming or MP3 giveaways - it amounts to the same thing - copyright theft."

Discography

Fripp has been extremely active as a recording musician and a producer. He has contributed to more than 700 official releases. The Robert Fripp Discography Summary, compiled by John Relph, also lists 120 compilations and 315 unauthorised releases (such as bootlegs). This means that more than 1100 releases (including both official and unofficial ones, as well as both studio and live recordings) can be found with Fripp participating. Studio releases are listed here.

Giles, Giles & Fripp
 1968 : The Cheerful Insanity of Giles, Giles and Fripp
 2001 : The Brondesbury Tapes
 2001 : Metaphormosis

Solo

Studio albums
 1979 : Exposure
 1980 : God Save the Queen/Under Heavy Manners
 1981 : Let the Power Fall: An Album of Frippertronics
 1998 : The Gates Of Paradise

Live albums
 1994 : 1999: Soundscapes Live in Argentina
 1995 : Radiophonics: 1995 Soundscapes volume 1
 1995 : A Blessing of Tears: 1995 Soundscapes volume 2
 1996 : That Which Passes: 1995 Soundscapes volume 3
 1998 : November Suite
 2005 : Love Cannot Bear
 2007 : At the End of Time: Churchscapes Live in England & Estonia

Brian Eno
 1973 : (No Pussyfooting)
 1974 : Here Come the Warm Jets
 1975 : Evening Star
 1975 : Another Green World
 1994 : The Essential Fripp And Eno
 1998 : Lightness: For The Marble Palace
 2004 : The Equatorial Stars
 2006 : The Cotswold Gnomes aka Beyond_Even_(1992–2006)
 2021 : Live in Paris 28.05.1975

David Bowie
 1977 : "Heroes"
 1980 : Scary Monsters (and Super Creeps)

David Sylvian
 1986 : Gone to Earth
 1993 : The First Day
 1993 : Darshan (The Road To Graceland)
 1994 : Damage: Live

Andy Summers
 1982 : I Advance Masked
 1984 : Bewitched
 1984 : Andy Summers & Robert Fripp Speak Out - Promo album

The League of Gentlemen
 1981 : The League of Gentlemen
 1996 : Thrang Thrang Gozinbulx

The League of Crafty Guitarists
 1986 : The League of Crafty Guitarists Live !
 1991 : Live II
 1991 : Show Of Hands
 1995 : Intergalactic Boogie Express

Theo Travis
 2008 : Thread
 2012 : Follow
 2012 : Discretion

Soundscapes
 1994 : 1999 Soundscapes: Live in Argentina
 1995 : A Blessing of Tears: 1995 Soundscapes, Vol. 2
 1996 : Radiophonics: 1995 Soundscapes, Vol. 1
 1996 : That Which Passes: 1995 Soundscapes, Vol. 3
 1997 : November Suite: Soundscapes - Live at Green Park Station 1996

Other recordings
 1981 : The Warner Brothers Music Show - The Return Of King Crimson (interviews with music inserts)
 1985 : Network (EP, compilation)
 1986 : The Lady or the Tiger (With Toyah Willcox)
 1991 : Kneeling at the Shrine (With Sunday All Over the World)
 1993 : The Bridge Between (With The Robert Fripp String Quintet)
 1994 : FFWD (With The Orb)
 1999 : The Repercussions of Angelic Behavior (With Bill Rieflin & Trey Gunn)
 2000 : A Temple in the Clouds (With Jeffrey Fayman)
 2007 : Robert Fripp : Unplugged - 3 CD Box-set
 2011 : A Scarcity of Miracles (With Mel Collins & Jakko Jakszyk)
 2012 : The Wine of Silence (With Andrew Keeling, David Singleton & Metropole Orkest)
 2015 : Starless Starlight : David Cross & Robert Fripp

Collaborations
 1970 : H to He, Who Am the Only One : Van der Graaf Generator
 1971 : Pawn Hearts : Van der Graaf Generator
 1971 : Fools Mate : Peter Hammill
 1971 : Septober Energy : Centipede
 1972 : Blueprint : Keith Tippett
 1972 : Matching Mole's Little Red Record : Matching Mole
 1973 : Ovary Lodge : Keith Tippett
 1977 : Peter Gabriel I : Peter Gabriel
 1978 : Parallel Lines : Blondie
 1978 : Peter Gabriel II : Peter Gabriel
 1979 : Fear of Music : Talking Heads
 1979 : The Roches : The Roches
 1980 : Sacred Songs : Daryl Hall
 1980 : Peter Gabriel III : Peter Gabriel
 1982 : Keep On Doing : The Roches
 1985 : Alchemy: An Index of Possibilities : David Sylvian
 1986 : Gone to Earth : David Sylvian
 1987 : Couple in Spirit :  Keith Tippett and Julie Tippetts
 1993 : Beyond These Shores : Iona
 1994 : Sidi Mansour : Cheikha Rimitti
 1994 : Flowermouth : No Man
 1994 : Battle Lines : John Wetton
 1995 : Cheikha Rimitti Featuring Robert Fripp and Flea : Cheikha [Unreleased Tracks From The Sidi Mansour Album]
 1996 : The Woman's Boat : Toni Childs
 1998 : Arkangel : John Wetton
 1999 : Birth of a Giant : Bill Rieflin
 1999 : Approaching Silence : David Sylvian
 2000 : Everything and Nothing : David Sylvian
 2001 : Sinister : John Wetton
 2001 : The Thunderthief : John Paul Jones
 2002 : Trance Spirits : Steve Roach & Jeffrey Fayman With Robert Fripp & Momodou Kah
 2002 : Camphor : David Sylvian
 2006 : Side Three : Adrian Belew
 2011 : Raised in Captivity : John Wetton

Production 

 1971 : Septober Energy : Centipede
 1972 : Matching Mole's Little Red Record : Matching Mole
 1972 : Blueprint : Keith Tippett
 1973 : Ovary Lodge : Ovary Lodge - With Keith Tippett, Roy Babbington, etc.
 1978 : Peter Gabriel : Peter Gabriel
 1979 : The Roches : The Roches
 1980 : Sacred Songs : Daryl Hall
 1991 : The California Guitar Trio : The California Guitar Trio - Executive producer
 1995 : Intergalactic Boogie Express : Coproducer.
 1998 : Pathways : California Guitar Trio - Executive producer

See also 
 List of ambient music artists

Notes

References

Further reading

External links

 
 

 
1946 births
Ambient musicians
Discipline Global Mobile artists
E.G. Records artists
English bandleaders
English experimental musicians
English motivational speakers
English record producers
English rock guitarists
English male guitarists
G3 (tour)
Inventors of musical tunings
King Crimson members
Lead guitarists
Living people
Musicians from Dorset
People from Wimborne Minster
Progressive rock guitarists
Recipients of the Order of the Cross of Terra Mariana, 4th Class
Rhythm guitarists
Virgin Records artists
People from Pershore